Juche, officially the Juche idea, is the state ideology of North Korea and the official ideology of the Workers' Party of Korea. North Korean sources attribute its conceptualization to Kim Il-sung, the country's founder and first leader. Juche was originally regarded as a variant of Marxism–Leninism until Kim Jong-il, Kim Il-sung's son and successor, declared it a distinct ideology in the 1970s. Kim Jong-il further developed Juche in the 1980s and 1990s by making ideological breaks from Marxism–Leninism and increasing the importance of his father's ideas.

Juche incorporates the historical materialist ideas of Marxism–Leninism but also strongly emphasizes the individual, the nation state, and national sovereignty. Juche posits that a country will prosper once it has become self-reliant by achieving political, economic, and military independence. As Kim Jong-il emerged as Kim Il-sung's likely successor in the 1970s, loyalty to the leader was increasingly emphasized as an essential part of Juche, as expressed in the Ten Principles for the Establishment of a Monolithic Ideological System.

Juche has been variously described by critics as a quasi-religion, a nationalist ideology, and a deviation from Marxism–Leninism.

Etymology 
Juche comes from the Sino-Japanese word , whose Japanese reading is shutai. The word migrated to the Korean language at around the turn of the century and retained this meaning. Shutai went on to appear in Japanese translations of Karl Marx's writings. North Korean editions of Marx used the word Juche even before the word was attributed to Kim Il-sung in its supposedly novel meaning in 1955.

In contemporary political discourse on North Korea, Juche has a connotation of "self-reliance", "autonomy", and "independence". It is often defined in opposition to the Korean concept of Sadae, or reliance on the great powers. South Koreans use the word without reference to the North Korean ideology.

The ideology is officially known as Juche sasang in Korean and the Juche idea in English. Juche sasang literally means "subject idea" and has also been translated as Juche thought or Jucheism. Adherents of Juche are sometimes referred to as "Jucheists".

Development 
Official statements by the North Korean government attribute the origin of Juche to Kim Il-sung's experiences in the Down-with-Imperialism Union during Korea's liberation struggle against Japan. However, the first documented reference to Juche as an ideology did not appear until 1955, when Kim Il-sung delivered a speech entitled "On Eliminating Dogmatism and Formalism and Establishing Juche in Ideological Work". The speech had been delivered to promote a political purge similar to the earlier Yan'an Rectification Movement in China. It later became known as the "Juche speech" and is considered one of Kim Il-sung's most important works.

Western scholars generally agree that Hwang Jang-yop, Kim Il-sung's top adviser on philosophy, was the actual person responsible for the conceptualization and early development of Juche. Hwang rediscovered the Juche speech sometime in the late 1950s, when Kim Il-sung, having established a cult of personality, sought to develop his own version of Marxism–Leninism and solidify his position within the Workers' Party of Korea (WPK). Hwang subsequently expanded upon the meaning of Juche and rewrote Korean communist history to make it appear as though Kim Il-sung had been the WPK's leader since its inception. Andrei Lankov, a Russian scholar of Korean studies, argues that the first reference to Juche as an ideology did not come until 14 April 1965, when Kim Il-sung gave a speech in Indonesia entitled "On Socialist Construction in the Democratic People's Republic of Korea and the South Korean Revolution". Lankov posits that the 1955 speech "used the word in a different meaning" and that Juche was not adopted as the "basic ideological principle of North Korean politics" until after the 1965 speech.

On the Juche Idea, the principal work on Juche, was published under Kim Jong-il's name in 1982. In North Korea it serves as "the authoritative and comprehensive explanation of Juche". According to the treatise, the WPK is responsible for educating the masses in the ways of Juche thinking. Juche is inexorably linked with Kim Il-sung and "represents the guiding idea of the Korean revolution". Although Juche has its roots in Marxism–Leninism, it is not merely a creative application of the ideas of Marx and Lenin to Korean conditions. Rather, it is a "new phase of revolutionary theory" and represents "a new era in the development of human history". Kim Jong-il also criticized the Korean communists and nationalists of the 1920s for their "elitist posture", claiming that they were "divorced from the masses".

The North Korean government issued a decree on 8 July 1997, the third anniversary of the death of Kim Il-sung, declaring the adoption of the Juche calendar. The  subsequently promulgated regulations regarding its use in August 1997, and the calendar entered public usage on 9 September 1997, the Day of the Foundation of the Republic. Gregorian calendar dates are used for years before 1912 while years from 1912 (the year of Kim Il-sung's birth) onwards are described as "Juche years". The Gregorian year , for example, is "Juche " as  − 1911 = . When used, "Juche years" are often accompanied by the Gregorian equivalent, i.e. "Juche , " or "Juche ".

Core principles 
The goal of Juche is to establish a self-reliant state which independently determines its political, economic, and military affairs. Kim Il-sung summarized the application of this objective to North Korea in a 1967 speech to the Supreme People's Assembly entitled "Let Us Embody the Revolutionary Spirit of Independence, Self-sustenance and Self-defence More Thoroughly in All Fields of State Activity":

Political independence is a core principle of Juche. Juche stresses equality and mutual respect among nations, asserting that every state has the right to self-determination. Yielding to foreign pressure or intervention would violate the principle of political independence and threaten a country's ability to defend its sovereignty. However, Juche does not advocate total isolation and encourages cooperation between socialist states. As Kim Jong-il summarizes in his work On the Juche Idea: "Independence is not in conflict with internationalism but is the basis of its strengthening". Kim Il-sung acknowledged that it was important for North Korea to learn from other socialist states, in particular the Soviet Union and China, but he did not want to follow their examples dogmatically. In this regard, Kim Il-sung said that the WPK needed to "resolutely repudiate the tendency to swallow things of others undigested or imitate them mechanically", attributing the early success of North Korea to the WPK's independence in policymaking.

Economic self-sufficiency is required to achieve political independence, according to adherents of Juche. Kim Il-sung believed that excessive foreign aid threatened a country's ability to develop socialism, which only a state with a strong, independent economy could build. In his work On the Juche Idea, Kim Jong-il argued that a state can only achieve economic self-sufficiency once it has created an "independent national economy" based on heavy industry, as this sector would theoretically drive the rest of the economy. Kim Jong-il also emphasized the importance of technological independence and self-sufficiency in resources. However, he stated that this did not rule out "economic cooperation" between socialist states.

Military self-reliance is also crucial for a state to maintain its political independence. To accomplish military self-reliance, states must develop a domestic defence industry to avoid dependence on foreign arms suppliers. Kim Jong-il argued that it was acceptable for socialist states to receive military aid from their allies, but such aid would only be effective if the state is militarily strong in its own right.

Juche in practice

Diplomacy 
North Korea maintained close relations with the Soviet Union and China during the Cold War, having emerged from Soviet occupation and a war which it fought alongside Chinese communists. However, North Korea also opposed what it viewed as Soviet and Chinese attempts to interfere in its post-war affairs. For example, a failed challenge against Kim Il-sung's leadership in 1956 led to the purge of both pro-Soviet and pro-Chinese elements from the WPK. Although North Korea rejected the de-Stalinization efforts of Soviet premier Nikita Khrushchev, it avoided taking sides during the Sino-Soviet split.

North Korea was admitted to the Non-Aligned Movement in 1975 and has since presented itself as a leader of the Third World, promoting Juche as a model for developing countries to follow.

National survival has been seen as a guiding principle of North Korea's diplomatic strategy. As countries in the Eastern Bloc collapsed and introduced market reforms, North Korea increasingly emphasized Juche in both theory and practice. Even in the midst of economic and political crises, North Korea continues to emphasize its independence on the world stage.

Anti-imperialism 
The diplomatic nature of Juche is based on opposition to "sadaejuui" (사대주의). The North Korean government began to distance itself politically from both China and the Soviet Union in the early 1960s. Bruce Cumings analyzed that the reason why North Korea does not collapse is that it is a thoroughly anti-imperialist country. The North Korean government continues to promote anti-American, anti-Chinese, and anti-Japanese sentiment among its people.

Economics 

After the devastation of the Korean War, North Korea began to rebuild its economy with a base in heavy industry, with the aim of becoming as self-sufficient as possible. As a result, North Korea developed what has been called the "most autarkic industrial economy in the world". While North Korea received economic aid and technical assistance from the Soviet Union and China, it did not join Comecon, the communist common market. In the 1990s, it had one of the world's lowest rates for dependence on petroleum, using hydroelectric power and coal instead of imported oil. Its textile industry uses vinylon, known as the "Juche fiber", which was invented by a Korean and which is made from locally available coal and limestone. The history of the development of vinylon often featured in propaganda that preached the virtues of technological self-reliance. North Korea had 10,000 CNC machines in 2010. The first domestic homemade CNC machine was introduced in 1995 and in 2017 it has around 15,000 machines.

Commentators have often pointed out the discrepancy between the principle of self-sufficiency and North Korea's dependence on foreign aid, especially during its economic crisis in the 1990s. The pursuit of economic autarky has been blamed for contributing to the crisis. On this view, attempts at self-sufficiency led to inefficiency and to the neglect of export opportunities in industries where there was a comparative advantage.

Defence 
The Korean People's Army is one of the largest on earth and has developed its own nuclear missiles. It produces UDMH fuel for liquid fuelled missiles and Tumansky RD-9 Turbojet engines, which power the Mikoyan-Gurevich MiG-19 and Shenyang J-6. CNC machines are used for production of missiles and centrifuges. North Korea's propaganda since the Korean War has contrasted its military autonomy with the presence of U.S. forces in the South.

International outreach 

Kim Il-sung believed that Juche principles could be applied around the world, not just in Korea. North Korea has organized international seminars on Juche since 1976. The International Scientific Seminar on the Juche Idea took place in Antananarivo, Madagascar, from 28 to 30 September 1976 under the sponsorship of the Democratic Republic of Madagascar. Many prominent party and government officials, public figures, representatives of revolutionary and progressive organizations, scientists and journalists from more than fifty countries attended. Malagasy President Didier Ratsiraka expressed strong sympathies and support for North Korea. An excerpt from the opening speech says:

The North Korean government established the International Institute of the Juche Idea (initially the International Juche Research Centre) in Tokyo in 1978 in order to supervise the activities of international Juche study groups. Tribute plaques from these groups are contained in the Juche Tower in Pyongyang. In the late 1960s and early 1970s, the Black Panther Party of the United States studied Juche. In 2016, the Nepal Workers' and Peasants' Party declared Juche its guiding idea.

Related concepts

Songun 

Songun was first mentioned on 7 April 1997 in Rodong Sinmun under the headline "There Is a Victory for Socialism in the Guns and Bombs of the People's Army". Its description in the article echoed the military-centered thinking of the time: "[Songun is] the revolutionary philosophy to safeguard our own style of socialism under any circumstances". The concept was credited to Kim Jong-il, who posited that Songun was the next stage of development of Juche.

An editorial titled "Our Party's Military-First Politics Will Inevitably Achieve Victory and Will Never Be Defeated" was jointly published by Kulloja and Rodong Sinmun (the WPK's theoretical magazine and newspaper, respectively) on 16 June 1999. In it, it was stated that Songun meant "the leadership method under the principle of giving priority to the military and resolving the problems that may occur in the course of revolution and construction as well as establishing the military as the main body of the revolution in the course of achieving the total tasks of socialism". While the article often referred to "our Party", this was not a reference to the WPK but rather to the personal leadership of Kim Jong-il.

On 5 September 1998, the North Korean Constitution was revised and it made clear that the National Defence Commission, the highest military body, was the supreme body of the state. This date is considered the beginning of the Songun era.

In late 2021, Kim Jong-un declared that the "military-first" politics of Songun would be replaced by "people-first politics" guided by himself.

"Great Leader" theory 

Unlike Marxism–Leninism, which considers developments in the material conditions of production and exchange as the driving force of historical progress (known as historical materialism), Juche considers human beings in general the driving force in history. It is summarized as "the popular masses are placed in the center of everything, and the leader is the center of the masses". Juche, North Korea maintains, is a "man-centered ideology" in which "man is the master of everything and decides everything". In contrast to Marxism–Leninism, in which a people's decisions are conditioned by their relations to the means of production, Juche argues that people's decisions take consideration of, but are independent from, external factors. Just like Marxism–Leninism, Juche believes history is law-governed, but that it is only man who drives progress, stating that "the popular masses are the drivers of history". However, for the masses to be successful, they need a "Great Leader". Marxism–Leninism argues that the popular masses will lead (on the basis of their relation to production), but in North Korea the role of a Great Leader should be essential for leadership. This theory allegedly helped Kim Il-sung establish a unitary, one-man rule over North Korea.

The theory turns the Great Leader into an absolutist, supreme leader. The working class is not to think for themselves, but instead to think through the Great Leader. The Great Leader is the "top brain" (i.e. "mastermind") of the working class, meaning that he is the only legitimate representative of the working class. Class struggle can be realized only through the Great Leader and difficult tasks in general and revolutionary changes in particular can be introduced only through and by the Great Leader. In historical development, it is the Great Leader who is the leading force of the working class. The Great Leader is also a flawless and incorruptible human being who never commits mistakes, who is always benevolent and who always rules for the masses. For the Great Leader system to function, a unitary ideological system must be in place; the Ten Principles for a Monolithic Ideological System was thus introduced by Kim Jong-il for this purpose.

Kimilsungism–Kimjongilism 

Kimilsungism and the Ten Principles for the Establishment of a Monolithic Ideological System were formally introduced by Kim Jong-il in 1974. Kim Jong-il reportedly did so to strengthen his position within the WPK, taking advantage of his father's political supremacy. Kimilsungism refers to the ideas of Kim Il-sung, while the Ten Principles serve as a guide for North Korean political and social life. Kim Jong-il argued that his father's ideas had evolved and they therefore deserved their own distinct name. North Korean state media had previously described Kim Il-sung's ideas as "contemporary Marxism–Leninism"; by calling them "Kimilsungism", Kim Jong-il sought to elevate the ideas of his father to the same level of prestige as Stalinism and Maoism. Not long after the introduction of "Kimilsungism" into the North Korean lexicon, Kim Jong-il began calling for a "Kimilsungist transformation" of North Korean society.

Political analyst Lim Jae-cheon argues that there is no discernible difference between Kimilsungism and Juche, and that the two terms are interchangeable. However, in his 1976 speech "On Correctly Understanding the Originality of Kimilsungism", Kim Jong-il said that Kimilsungism comprises the "Juche idea and a far-reaching revolutionary theory and leadership method evolved from this idea". He further added that "Kimilsungism is an original idea that cannot be explained within the frameworks of Marxism–Leninism. The Juche idea, which constitutes the quintessence of Kimilsungism, is an idea newly discovered in the history of mankind". Kim Jong-il went further, stating that Marxism–Leninism had become obsolete and must be replaced by Kimilsungism:

According to analyst Shin Gi-wook, the ideas of Juche and Kimilsungism are in essence the "expressions of North Korean particularism over supposedly more universalistic Marxism–Leninism". The new terminology signalled a move from socialism to nationalism. This was evident in a speech presented by Kim Jong-il in 1982, during celebrations of his father's 70th birthday, in which he stated that love for the nation came before love for socialism. This particularism gave birth to such concepts as "A Theory of the Korean Nation as Number One" and "Socialism of Our Style".

Following the death of Kim Jong-il in December 2011, Kimilsungism became Kimilsungism–Kimjongilism at the 4th Conference of the Workers' Party of Korea in April 2012. Party members at the conference also stated that the WPK was "the party of Kim Il-sung and Kim Jong-il" and declared Kimilsungism–Kimjongilism "the only guiding idea of the party". Afterwards, the Korean Central News Agency (KCNA) stated that "the Korean people have long called the revolutionary policies ideas of the President [Kim Il-sung] and Kim Jong-il as Kimilsungism–Kimjongilism and recognized it as the guiding of the nation". Kim Jong-un, the son of Kim Jong-il who succeeded him as leader of the WPK, said:

Socialism of Our Style 
"Socialism of Our Style", also referred to as Korean-style socialism and our-style socialism within North Korea, is an ideological concept Kim Jong-il introduced on 27 December 1990 in the speech "Socialism of Our Country is a Socialism of Our Style as Embodied by the Juche Idea". Speaking after the Revolutions of 1989 that brought down the Eastern Bloc countries, Kim Jong-il explicitly stated that North Korea neededand survived because ofSocialism of Our Style. He argued that socialism in Eastern Europe failed because they "imitated the Soviet experience in a mechanical manner". According to Kim, they failed to understand that the Soviet experience was based on specific historical and social circumstances and could not be used by other countries aside from the Soviet Union itself. He added that "if experience is considered absolute and accepted dogmatically it is impossible to build Socialism properly, as the times change and the specific situation of each country is different from another". Kim Jong-il went on to criticize "dogmatic application" of Marxism–Leninism, stating:

North Korea would not encounter such difficulties because of the conceiving of Juche. In his words, North Korea was "a backward, colonial semifeudal society" when the communists took over, but since the North Korean communists did not accept Marxism, which was based on European experiences with capitalism, or Leninism, which was based on Russia's experience, they conceived of Juche. He believed the situation in North Korea was more complex because of the nearby American presence in South Korea. Thanks to Kim Il-sung, Kim Jong-il argued, the revolution had "put forward original lines and policies suited to our people's aspirations and the specific situation of our country". "The Juche idea is a revolutionary theory which occupies the highest stage of development of the revolutionary ideology of the working class", Kim Jong-il said, further stating that the originality and superiority of the Juche idea defined and strengthened Korean socialism. He then conceded by stating that Socialism of Our Style was "a man-centered Socialism", explicitly making a break with basic Marxist–Leninist thought, which argues that material forces are the driving force of historical progress, not people. Socialism of Our Style was presented as an organic sociopolitical theory, using the language of Marxism–Leninism, saying:

Analysis

Comparisons to religion 
A number of scholars have described Juche as a quasi-religion and compared its facets to those of pre-existing religions in Korea. Jung Tae-il argues that certain elements of Christianity, Cheondoism, and Confucianism were appropriated by and incorporated into Juche. Korean cultural anthropologists Byung Ho Chung and Heonik Kwon liken the commemorations of Kim Il-sung and Kim Jong-il to Confucian ancestor worship. Ju Jun-hui similarly contends that Korean shamanism also influenced the development of Juche, comparing the ecstatic state experienced in a shamanic ritual (gut) to the enthusiasm and fervor displayed by North Koreans for their supreme leader. Scholars have also pointed to the presence of a sacred leader, rituals, and familism as tenets of Juche that make it religious-like.

Presence of a sacred leader 
The ideology teaches that the role of a Great Leader is essential for the popular masses to succeed in their revolutionary movement because without leadership they are unable to survive. This is the foundation of the personality cult directed at Kim Il-sung. The personality cult explains how the Juche ideology has been able to endure until today, even during the North Korean government's undeniable dependence on foreign assistance during its famine in the 1990s. The concept of a "sacred leader" in Juche as well as the cult around the Kim family has been compared to the State Shinto ideology of Imperial Japan in which the Emperor was seen as a divine being.

Through the fundamental belief in the essential role of the Great Leader, the former North Korean leader Kim Il-sung has become the "supreme deity for the people" and the Juche doctrine is reinforced in North Korea's constitution as the country's guiding principle. The parallel relationship structure between Kim Il-sung and his people to religious founders or leaders and their followers has led many scholars to consider Juche a religious movement as much as a political ideology. However, those familiar with cults would again posit that Juche bypasses the tenets of religion completely and instead meets the criteria of a totalitarian cult.

Juche emphasis on the political and sacred role of the leader and the ensuing worshipping by the popular masses has been critiqued by various Western Marxist intellectuals. They argue that the North Korean working class or the proletariat has been stripped of their honour and therefore call the cult of personality non-Marxist and non-democratic.

Rituals 
The religious behaviour of Juche can also be seen in the perspectives of the North Korean people through refugee interviews from former participants in North Korea's ritual occasions. One pertinent example is the Arirang Festival, which is a gymnastics and artistic festival held in the Rungrado May Day Stadium in Pyongyang. All components of the festival, from the selection of performers, mobilization of resources, recruitment of the audience and publicity for the show have been compared to facets of a national religious event.

The Arirang Festival has been described to demonstrate the power of the North Korean government to arrange a form of religious gathering. It has done so by "appropriating a mass of bodies for calisthenic and performative arts representing the leader as the father and his faithful followers". The festival's effectiveness in transforming its participants into loyal disciples of Juche seems to originate from the collectivist principle of "one for all and all for one" and the ensuing emotional bond and loyalty to the leader. According to the accounts of refugees who have been recruited to mass gymnastics, the collectivist principle has been nurtured through physical punishment such as beatings and more importantly the organization of recruits into small units, whose performances were held accountable by larger units. The festival's ritual components of collectivism serve to reinforce a "certain structure of sociality and affect", establishing Kim Il-sung as the "father" in both the body and psyche of the performers.

Familism 
American historian Charles K. Armstrong argues that familism has transformed itself into a kind of political religion in the form of Juche. With the emergence of Juche as North Korea's guiding political principle since the 1960s, the familial relationship within the micro-family unit has been translated into a national, macro-unit with Kim Il-sung representing the father figure and the North Korean people representing his children. Juche is thus based on the language of family relationships with its East Asian or neo-Confucian "resonances of filial piety and maternal love".

Armstrong also notes that North Korea has actually transferred the "filial piety of nationalism in the family of the leader himself" by positioning Kim Il-sung as the universal patriarch. He argues that while the official pursuit of the Juche ideology in the 1960s signalled North Korea's desire to separate from the "fraternity of international socialism", the ideology also replaced Stalin as the father figure with Kim Il-sung. In effect, North Korea's familial nationalism has supplanted the "rather abstract, class-oriented language of socialism with a more easily understandable and identifiable language of familial connections, love and obligations".

After attaining significant positions in the WPK and military in the early 1980s, Kim Jong-il transformed the personality cult surrounding Kim Il-sung into a family cult and became the heir apparent. Armstrong calls this a "family romance", which is a term Freud had used to describe "the neurotic replacement of a child's real parents with fantasy substitutes". Kim Il-sung's consecration as the "Great Father" has been strengthened by the development of the North Korean family romance with the language, symbols, and rituals associated with familism.

Criticisms 
Juche has been described by critics as a nationalist ideology and a departure from Marxist–Leninist principles. B. R. Myers, Michael J. Seth, and Max Fisher go further and argue that Juche has more in common with Japanese fascism and ultranationalism than Marxism–Leninism. Korean political scientist Suh Dae-sook argues that Kim Il-sung failed to explain the difference between socialist patriotism, which Kim Il-sung stated that he supported, and nationalism, which Kim Il-sung stated that he opposed. Suh also criticized Kim Il-sung's initial conceptualization of Juche, saying that he had failed to explain how Marxism–Leninism had been applied to Korean conditions. American historian Derek R. Ford, by contrast, emphasizes the continuity between Marxism–Leninism and Juche, and credits Juche as the unique guiding principle which allowed North Korea to survive the collapse of the Eastern Bloc.

American historian Charles K. Armstrong argues that North Korea may appear "Stalinist in form" but is "nationalist in content". Shin Gi-wook similarly argues that "there is no trace of Marxism–Leninism or the Stalinist notion of nationhood" in North Korea, and its government instead stresses the importance of the Korean people's blood, soul, and national traits, echoing earlier Korean nationalists such as Sin Chaeho, Yi Kwangsu and Choe Namson. Shin believes that the key difference between Marxism–Leninism and Juche is that the latter places the primacy of ideology over materialism; the vocabulary of family lineage and nationalism is retained and given primacy over class struggle, while social distinction and hierarchy are supported instead of a classless society and egalitarianism.

A few critics have dismissed the notion that Juche is an ideology altogether. Myers argues that Juche cannot be described as a true political ideology because it does not have an underlying belief system, while Alzo David-West describes it as "meaningless on logical and naturalistic grounds". American political analyst Robert E. Kelly argues that Juche exists solely to protect the Kim family's monopoly over political power in North Korea. However, Myers dismisses the idea that Juche is North Korea's leading ideology, regarding its public exaltation as being designed to deceive foreigners. He argues that it exists to be praised and not actually read. Based on his own experiences living in North Korea, Swiss businessman Felix Abt describes Myers' arguments as "shaky" and "questionable". Having seen the extent to which North Korean university students actually believe in Juche, Abt says it is "rather absurd" to describe the ideology as "window-dressing" for foreigners. American historian Bruce Cumings and Professor of International Relations Christoph Bluth similarly argue that Juche is not mere rhetoric, but rather an ideal of self-reliance that North Korea has attempted to put into practice.

See also 

 Autarky
 Great man theory
 Ilminism, political ideology of South Korea's first president, Syngman Rhee
 Juche faction, a political faction within South Korea's student movements
 Kim Il-sung bibliography
 Kim Jong-il bibliography
 Kim Jong-un bibliography
 National communism

References

Citations

Sources

Books

Journal articles

News and magazine articles

Websites

Other

External links 

Communism
Anti-sadaejuui
Economic ideologies
Economy of North Korea
Far-left politics in Asia
Government of North Korea
Ideology of the Workers' Party of Korea
Isolationism
Left-wing nationalism
Kim Il-sung
Kim Jong-il
Korean nationalism
Korean philosophy
Nationalism by country
North Korean culture
Political theories
Politics of North Korea
Propaganda in North Korea
State ideologies
Totalitarianism
Types of socialism